Riemerella is a Gram-negative, non-spore-forming and non-motile genus of bacteria from the family of Weeksellaceae.Riemerella is named after O.V. Riemer.

References

Flavobacteria
Bacteria genera
Taxa described in 1993